ETR 324, ETR 425 and ETR 526 "Jazz" are some Italian Electric multiple units (EMU) used mainly for commuter regional trains.

Versions 
There are three different versions: 
 Four-coaches version (ETR 324);
 Five-coaches version (ETR 425);
 Six-coaches version (ETR 526);

Four-coaches version: ETR 324

Five-coaches version: ETR 425

Leonardo Express
All car are first class

Six-coaches version: ETR 526

References

External links

Transport in Italy
3000 V DC multiple units
Rolling stock of Italy